Cherkashin is a Russian masculine surname, its feminine counterpart is Cherkashina. It may refer to
Victor Cherkashin (born 1932), Soviet KGB counter-intelligence officer 
Valera & Natasha Cherkashin, contemporary artists

See also
5483 Cherkashin, a minor planet

Russian-language surnames